Amargo Chuncho or Chuncho Bitters is a bitters product from Peru traditionally used to make a Pisco Sour. 

Made in Lima, Peru, Amargo Chuncho bitters are aged for six months in barrels. The bitters comprise cinnamon, allspice, nutmeg, floral notes, cherry and cola.

References

External links

Bitters
Drink companies of Peru
Economy of Lima
Culture in Lima
Peruvian cuisine